Cabin Point is an unincorporated community in Surry County, Virginia, United States. Montpelier, a home which is listed on the National Register of Historic Places, is located near Cabin Point.

References

Unincorporated communities in Surry County, Virginia
Unincorporated communities in Virginia